Nasser Salih Nasser Abdullah Al-Attiyah ( : nāṣir ṣāliḥ nāṣir ʿabdullāh al-ʿaṭṭīyah; born 21 December 1970 in Doha) is a Qatari rally driver and sport shooter. He was the 2006 Production World Rally Champion, 2014 and 2015 WRC-2 champion, a 16 time Middle East Rally Champion, five times winner of the FIA World Cup for Cross-Country Rallies, and a five times (2011, 2015, 2019, 2022, 2023) Dakar Rally winner. His five victories in the Dakar Rally make him the only Middle Easterner and West Asian to win the competition more than once.

In shooting, Al-Attiyah won the bronze medal in the men's skeet event at the 2012 Summer Olympics in London.

Career

Rallying
Al-Attiyah has competed in the Middle East Rally Championship since 2003, having claimed 65 race wins and 13 titles. He drove a Subaru Impreza until 2009 and a Ford Fiesta since 2010, except in 2012 when he drove Peugeot 207 in two rounds, and in 2016 when he drove a Škoda Fabia.

Al-Attiyah also competed at the Production World Rally Championship from 2004 to 2009. He won the title in 2006, his third year in the championship alongside co-driver Chris Patterson, driving a Subaru Impreza. He gained the championship lead after finishing second in the PWRC class in the Rally Mexico and afterwards won the following two rounds, Rally Argentina and Acropolis Rally. He also finished runner-up in 2005 and third in 2009. He scored his first points during the 2009 season, finishing eighth overall in the Rally Argentina.

In 2010 and 2011, Al-Attiyah drove in the Super 2000 World Rally Championship for the Barwa Rally Team, classifying seventh overall in both years. For the 2012 season, Al-Attiyah moved to compete in the top division for the Qatar World Rally Team. He secured a career-best fourth place at the Rally de Portugal. In 2013 he switched to a Ford Fiesta WRC. He finished fifth overall at three races, and ranked 11th in the final standings.

Al-Attiyah stepped back to the WRC-2 in 2014. Driving a Ford Fiesta RRC, he scored four wins and won the championship. In 2015 he defended the championship with three wins.

Cross-country rally
Al-Attiyah debuted at the Dakar Rally in 2004 with Mitsubishi, finishing 10th overall. He entered the next three editions with an X-Raid BMW, finishing sixth in 2007.

After winning the 2008 FIA Cross Country Rally World Cup in a BMW, he took part alongside Swedish female co-driver Tina Thörner in the 2009 Dakar Rally in Argentina. He was among the frontrunners until he got disqualified on 8 January 2009 after he had missed 9 checkpoints, the rules stating that 4 missed checkpoints are the maximum. He finished second in the Rally dos Sertões from Goiânia to Natal in Brazil (24 June-3 July 2009) behind Carlos Sainz of Spain.

In the 2010 Dakar Rally, Al-Attiyah finished second, 2'12" behind Carlos Sainz, the smallest gap in the history of the race. On 15 January 2011, Al-Attiyah won the legendary Dakar race ahead of fellow Volkswagen drivers Sainz and Giniel de Villiers, making him the only Arab to ever win the difficult race.

The driver claimed the 2015 FIA Cross Country Rally World Cup with five wins and the 2015 Dakar Rally, driving a Mini All4 Racing X-Raid, and the 2016 FIA Cross Country Rally World Cup for Toyota with six wins.

In 2019 Al-Attiah won Silk Way Rally driving Toyota Hilux for the Toyota Gazoo Racing team. He finished second place in the 2019 Baja 1000. He also won the 2019 Dakar Rally.

In 2022 he won the 2022 Dakar Rally in Saudi Arabia, making him the only Arab to win the Dakar rally on Arab soil, ahead of 9 time World Rally Champion Sébastien Loeb (co-driver Fabian Lurquin). He would also win the inaugural FIA World Rally-Raid Championship title.

Extreme E

Al-Attiyah signed for Abt Cupra XE alongside 2001 Dakar Rally Winner Jutta Kleinschmidt to race in the 2022 Extreme E Championship.

Shooting

In shooting, Al-Attiyah came in fourth place in the 2004 Olympic Games in clay pigeon shooting and 15th overall in the 2008 Olympic Games, missing out on qualification for the final round by 2 points. In the 2012 Olympic Games he won the bronze medal after a shoot-off against Valeriy Shomin.

Career results

Circuit racing career summary

WRC results

PWRC results

SWRC results

WRC-2 Results

ERC results

Dakar Rally results

Complete World Touring Car Championship results
(key) (Races in bold indicate pole position) (Races in italics indicate fastest lap)

Complete World Rally-Raid Championship results
(key)

Complete Extreme E results
(key)

References

External links 

 
 Profile on ewrc-results.com

1970 births
Living people
Qatari racing drivers
Qatari rally drivers
Qatari male sport shooters
Olympic shooters of Qatar
Off-road racing drivers
Skeet shooters
Shooters at the 1996 Summer Olympics
Shooters at the 2000 Summer Olympics
Shooters at the 2004 Summer Olympics
Shooters at the 2008 Summer Olympics
Shooters at the 2012 Summer Olympics
Shooters at the 2016 Summer Olympics
Speedcar Series drivers
Dakar Rally drivers
Dakar Rally winning drivers
Asian Games medalists in shooting
World Rally Championship drivers
Olympic bronze medalists for Qatar
Olympic medalists in shooting
People from Doha
Medalists at the 2012 Summer Olympics
Shooters at the 1994 Asian Games
Shooters at the 1998 Asian Games
Shooters at the 2002 Asian Games
Shooters at the 2006 Asian Games
Shooters at the 2010 Asian Games
Shooters at the 2014 Asian Games
Shooters at the 2018 Asian Games
Asian Games gold medalists for Qatar
Asian Games bronze medalists for Qatar
Medalists at the 2002 Asian Games
Medalists at the 2010 Asian Games
European Rally Championship drivers
Extreme E drivers
Abt Sportsline drivers
Toyota Gazoo Racing drivers
Campos Racing drivers
World Touring Car Championship drivers
Nürburgring 24 Hours drivers
Volkswagen Motorsport drivers
Cupra Racing drivers